The Dominican Republic is a sovereign state occupying the eastern five-eighths of the island of Hispaniola, in the Greater Antilles archipelago in the Caribbean region. The country has the ninth-largest economy in Latin America and is the largest economy in the Caribbean and Central American region. Though long known for agriculture and mining, the economy is now dominated by services. Over the last two decades, the Dominican Republic have been standing out as one of the fastest-growing economies in the Americas - with an average real GDP growth rate of 5.4% between 1992 and 2014. GDP growth in 2014 and 2015 reached 7.3 and 7.0%, respectively, the highest in the Western Hemisphere. In the first half of 2016 the Dominican economy grew 7.4% continuing its trend of rapid economic growth.

For further information on the types of business entities in this country and their abbreviations, see "Business entities in the Dominican Republic".

Notable firms 
This list includes notable companies with primary headquarters located in the country. The industry and sector follow the Industry Classification Benchmark taxonomy. Organizations which have ceased operations are included and noted as defunct.

See also 
 List of airlines of the Dominican Republic
 List of banks in the Dominican Republic

References 

 
Dominican Republic